Egeby Mølle (Egeby Windmill) is a post mill located  east of Aakirkeby on the Danish island of Bornholm. Built in 1787, it remained in service until the late 1920s.

History

First built in 1787, in connection with a move in 1794 which brought it closer to the road, the mill was slightly enlarged, making it  wider. In 1847, the mill was repaired after being struck by lightning. Originally there was a half-timbered mill house next to the mill, still visible on a photograph from 1928. In 1934, Foreningen Bornholm acquired the mill and has since taken care of its upkeep. New sails were fitted in the 1960s but had to be removed in 1987 after a storm. In 1996, comprehensive restoration work was carried out and completed in 1999, bringing the mill into a fully operational state. Since 1964, Egeby Mølle has been a listed building.

The first recorded owner was Hans Peter Hiorth (1800). The last was Mathis Peder Madsen who bought it on 12 June 1906. Foreningen Bornholm acquired it on 28 March 1935.

Description
Of the three surviving post mills on Bornholm, Egeby is the most characteristic. A timber structure with a wooden roof, the mill has four latticed sails. The single millstone is of Nexø sandstone. During the restoration work completed in 1999, much of the original machinery was retained but the sails, base, roofing and external cladding were replaced.

In addition to Egeby Mølle, there are two other post mills on Bornholm, Bechs Mølle and Tejn Mølle, both listed.

See also
List of windmills on Bornholm

References

Bornholm
Listed buildings and structures in Bornholm
Windmills completed in 1787
Post mills in Denmark
1787 establishments in Denmark
Listed windmills in Denmark